McQueen were a rock band from Brighton, England, formed in 2004. They have released one album (Break The Silence) on Demolition Records. McQueen has toured all over Europe and played shows in the US and Asia including headlining the Unite Festival in Vietnam in 2007.

McQueen have not played any shows in the UK since the Velvet Revolver support tour in 2008. In May 2016, American rock band Pop Evil announced that Hayley Cramer will be their new drummer.

Formation
The current line-up of McQueen is as follows:
 Leah Duors - vocals
 Hayley Cramer - drums
 Constanze Hart - bass guitar

Past members:
 Hattie Williams - bass guitar 2004-2004
 Sophie Taylor - bass guitar 2004-2006 and 2008-2008
 Gina Collins - bass guitar (Jan - Sept 2007)
 Kat Bax - bass guitar (Oct - Nov 2007)
 Cat de Casanove - guitar (2004–2009)

Temporary stand-ins:
 Vicky Smith - bass guitar (Nov - Dec 2006, July 2007, Dec 2007 - Jan 2008)

Discography

Albums

Break the Silence
Released 22 January 2007 on Demolition Records.

EPs
You Leave me Dead/Like I Care (2004) Furry Tongue Records

Singles
"Running Out of Things To Say" (2005) Furry Tongue Records
"Line Went Dead" (2007) Released as a download only through Demolition Records

Live performances
McQueen started performing live in venues around their home town of Brighton in February 2004. By June of that year, they had started to play at venues in London, and from there began touring the UK as supporting artist for various acts including Roxy Saint and The Holiday Plan. Their first headline tour was a university tour in January/February 2005. They played seven UK university venues. 2005 also saw McQueen's first non-UK live performance, at Highfields Festival, Germany.
Since starting out, McQueen have toured with W.A.S.P., Hanoi Rocks and Wednesday 13 and played the rock tent at Hyde Park Calling in June 2007. They undertook their first "proper" UK headline tour in January 2007 to promote the release of their first album. In 2008, they also supported Velvet Revolver on various tour dates on their 2008 Revolution Tour. They also supported HIM on their Down Under tour. McQueen appeared at the Gibson Summer Jam 2008 in Nashville, Tennessee. They also played a set at the Quart festival in Norway.

References

External links
Official Website

English rock music groups
All-female bands
Musical groups established in 2004
2004 establishments in England
Musical groups from Brighton and Hove